The desert cisticola (Cisticola aridulus) is a species of bird in the family Cisticolidae.
It is present throughout much of sub-Saharan Africa, although relatively absent from central and coastal western areas of the continent.

References

External links
 Desert cisticola - Species text in The Atlas of Southern African Birds.

desert cisticola
Birds of Sub-Saharan Africa
desert cisticola
Taxonomy articles created by Polbot